Henry Smith (16 March 1955 – 14 March 2020) was a New Zealand-Samoan athlete. He competed in the men's discus throw at the 1984 Summer Olympics and the 1988 Summer Olympics.

References

External links
 

1955 births
2020 deaths
Athletes from Wellington City
Athletes (track and field) at the 1984 Summer Olympics
Athletes (track and field) at the 1988 Summer Olympics
Samoan male shot putters
Samoan male discus throwers
Olympic athletes of Samoa